The Bermúdez Municipality is one of the fifteen municipalities (municipios) that makes up the eastern Venezuelan state of Sucre and, according to a 2011 population estimate by the National Institute of Statistics of Venezuela, the municipality has a population of 165,675.  The city of Carúpano is the administrative centre for the Bermúdez Municipality. The municipality was named for Venezuelan independence hero José Francisco Bermúdez.

History
It was somewhere on the Paria Peninsula, near Carúpano, where Christopher Columbus first set foot on the American continent for the only time, during his third voyage (in all his other trips he only explored the Caribbean islands).

Demographics
The Bermúdez Municipality, according to a 2011 population estimate by the National Institute of Statistics of Venezuela, has a population of 165,675 (up from 128,123 in 2000). This amounts to 16.4% of the state's population.

Government
The municipality is divided into five parishes; Bolívar, Macarapana, Santa Catalina, Santa Rosa, and Santa Teresa. The elected office of mayor (alcalde) was established in 1990; however, the initial election was disputed. Carlos Monasterio was installed in 1990 and had served eighteen months when the court (Supreme Electoral Council) removed him, and established Juan Marquez Albornoz as the actual winner of the election.

Notable natives
Famous Carupaneros include:
Wolfgang Larrazábal, former President of Venezuela.
Jictzad Viña, Miss Venezuela 2005.
Eladio Lárez, president of Radio Caracas Televisión, one of Venezuela's largest television networks.
Jesús Flores, Washington Nationals major league baseball catcher.

See also
Corsican immigration to Venezuela

References

External links
bermudez-sucre.gob.ve 
Information on the Bermúdez Municipality 
Carúpano in venezuelatuya.com 
Carúpano tourist information 

Municipalities of Sucre (state)